Sir Robert Jackson (c. 1584 – 1645) was an English politician who sat in the House of Commons from 1621 to 1626.

He matriculated at St Alban Hall, Oxford  on 12 June 1601, aged 16 and was awarded  BA on 4 February 1605 and  MA on 20 January 1608. He was knighted  on 13 May 1617. He was an alderman at Berwick-upon-Tweed. In 1621, he was elected Member of Parliament for Berwick upon Tweed. He was re-elected MP for Berwick upon Tweed in 1624, 1625 and 1626.
 
Jackson died at the age of about 60 and was buried on 29 January 1645.

References

1580s births
1645 deaths
Alumni of St Alban Hall, Oxford
People from County Durham
English MPs 1621–1622
English MPs 1624–1625
English MPs 1625
English MPs 1626
People from Berwick-upon-Tweed